Miguel Cárdenas was a Mexican politician. He was candidate for the elections of 1894 for the post of governor of Coahuila and was supported by Bernardo Reyes. But  Cárdenas removed his candidacy as did José María Garza Galán. So, José María Múzquiz became governor. Eventually, Miguel Cárdenas became governor in 1894. He was governor until 1909. In 1905 Francisco Madero unsuccessfully opposed his reelection.

See also
History of Mexico
Mexico
Porfirio Díaz

Governors of Coahuila
Politicians from Coahuila
Year of death missing
Year of birth missing